Clara Hilda Sinde Ramallal (born December 28, 1935) is an arranger, composer, guitarist, and singer.

Sinde Ramallal was born in Buenos Aires, where she studied composition, voice, and guitar with Consuelo Mallo Lopez. In 1953, she received an honorary diploma from the Argentine Association for Chamber Music. She toured throughout South America as a singer and guitarist. Later, she performed with the Sinde Ramallal Trio which included two of her students, Gloria Boschi and Silvia Molinari.

Sinde Ramallal premiered works by the composers Elsa Calcagno, Alfonso Galluzzo, and Bianchi Pinero. Her works for guitar are published by Casa Ricordi, and include:

Composition 

Barmi Aire de Milonga

Arrangements 

Allegro, opus 100 (Mario Giuliani)
Concierto en Re (three guitars; Antonio Vivaldi)
Prelude No. 1 (Johann Sebastian Bach)
Rondo No. 2 (Matteo Carcassi)
Sonata-Gavota (Domenico Scarlatti)

Hear Clara Sinde Ramallal perform on guitar.

References 

Living people
Argentine composers
Argentine women composers
Argentine guitarists
People from Buenos Aires
1935 births